Nicolai Rapp (born 13 December 1996) is a German professional footballer who plays as a defensive midfielder or centre-back for 1. FC Kaiserslautern, on loan from Werder Bremen.

Club career
In summer 2017, Rapp signed with 2. Bundesliga side FC Erzgebirge Aue.

In January 2019, Rapp joined league rivals 1. FC Union Berlin having agreed a 3.5-year contract until summer 2022.

On 24 June 2021, it was announced Rapp would join Werder Bremen for the 2021–22 season. The transfer fee paid to Union Berlin was reported as about €200,000. Following Werder Bremen's return to the Bundesliga, he made seven substitute appearances in the 2022–23 season.

Having expressed his desire for more playing time, Rapp joined 1. FC Kaiserslautern on loan until the end of the 2022–23 season in January 2023.

International career
Rapp is a youth international for Germany.

Career statistics

References

External links
 

1996 births
Living people
Sportspeople from Heidelberg
German footballers
Footballers from Baden-Württemberg
Association football defenders
Germany youth international footballers
2. Bundesliga players
Regionalliga players
TSG 1899 Hoffenheim II players
SpVgg Greuther Fürth players
SpVgg Greuther Fürth II players
FC Erzgebirge Aue players
1. FC Union Berlin players
SV Darmstadt 98 players
SV Werder Bremen players
1. FC Kaiserslautern players